In Search of Dr. Seuss is a 1994 American television film chronicling the adventures of a news reporter, Kathy Lane (Kathy Najimy), who enters the world of Dr. Seuss by opening a magical book. Also starring in the film (in order of appearance) were Matt Frewer, Christopher Lloyd, Andrea Martin, David Paymer, Patrick Stewart, Andraé Crouch, Robin Williams, and Eileen Brennan.

Plot
Kathy Lane, a reporter, goes to Theodore Geisel's La Jolla home and meets a strange character.  Kathy tells him the editor for The Ferncrest Times demands her an article on Dr. Seuss. When she uses him as a source, the character reveals himself to be the Cat in the Hat. Kathy finds a magical book labeled "Open a book, open your imagination", which pulls her into the world of Dr. Seuss. The Cat in the Hat shows Kathy a political cartoon which would later become The Sneetches. The Cat then leads Kathy to a door which leads to a beach. On the beach, they read The Sneetches. The Cat then tells Kathy about Seuss being a target during World War I. She then ends up into a kitchen where she meets Mr. Hunch from Hunches in Bunches. They eat lunch and learn more about his childhood. Then Mr. Hunch shows her a book based on his childhood: McElligot's Pool.

Kathy notices Horton the Elephant and ends up in a jungle. She reads Horton Hatches the Egg. The Cat in the Hat appears, and explains to her about Seuss in the 1920s. Kathy then wanders into "The World of Advertising". The Ad Man and the Ad Woman explain about Dr. Seuss in the advertising business. The room rocks and Kathy is transported to Mulberry Street where she meets Marco. She helps Marco come up with a story to tell his father after he walks home from school.

The story changes as Kathy and Marco add exciting things to it. The story starts out as a horse pulling a cart. But it soon turns into a tale with an elephant, the mayor, planes with confetti, a Rajah, a band playing music and more. Marco keeps the story as a horse pulling a cart. He leaves.

Sgt. Mulvaney brings Kathy to a revolving door that is shown to represent the way people rejected Dr. Seuss' first book for publishing. The Sergeant disappears through the door. Kathy follows but ends up in a hall with the Cat in the Hat. The Cat explains to Kathy about some of Dr. Seuss' dark political cartoons. An alarm goes off and he disappears. Kathy walks into a room and meets The Voice of America. The Voice of America then shows Kathy the documentary, Hitler Lives, which was made by Geisel and his wife.

The Voice of America further reveals that Dr. Seuss' initial drawings of Yertle the Turtle depicted the character with a Hitler-esque mustache and a Nazi uniform. A live action version of the story is then shown in a gospel like song. Kathy meets back up with the Cat in the Hat, who tells her his own origin story as told by a father reading to his two daughters. After the story, Kathy ends up in the story of Green Eggs and Ham where she is chased by multiple Sam-I-Ams who try to get her to eat green eggs and ham. After that, Kathy ends up in the mountains where the Grinch had lived. A woman reads her How the Grinch Stole Christmas!

Next, Kathy shows up at the Street of the Lifted Lorax where the Cat tells her that while the Grinch was successful for Dr. Seuss professionally, his personal life wasn't and explains what happened to Seuss during the late 1960s. She then put in a payment (15 cents, a nail, and the shell of a great, great, great grandfather snail) written on paper in a bucket after which The Once-Ler hoisted up the bucket with all those things, collected them, brought down a speaker and told the story of The Lorax. After planting a new Truffula Tree, marching music sounded, indicating a butter battle which represents The Butter Battle Book.

Kathy and The Cat in the Hat visit the library where they sing Oh, the Places You'll Go! after which are transported back to Dr. Seuss' house. The film ends with a quote from Dr. Seuss: "I hope for the children a world of peace and they would never lose their sense of wonder and discovery. From there to here, from here to there. Funny things are everywhere".

Cast
 Kathy Najimy as Kathy Lane
 Matt Frewer as The Cat in the Hat
 Christopher Lloyd as Mr. Hunch
 Graham Jarvis as The Farmer
 Brady Bluhm as Marco (McElligot's Pool)
 Frank Welker dubbed the voices of Horton the Elephant, Mayzie the Bird, Morton the Elephant-Bird, the Mouse, the Elephant Hunters, Chief Yookeroo, Van Itch, and re-dubbed Hitler Lives Narrator
 David Paymer as the Ad Man
 Andrea Martin as the Ad Woman
 J. D. Daniels as Marco (Mulberry Street)
 Patrick Stewart as Sgt. Mulvaney
 Billy Crystal as Radio Voice (The Voice of America)
 Andraé Crouch as Yertle the Turtle
 Bright Eyes as Mack
 Robin Williams as The Father
 Zelda Williams and Eleanor Columbus as The Daughters
 Howie Mandel as Sam-I-Am Voice-Over
 Eileen Brennan as Who-Villain
 Malachi Pearson as Additional Voice-Over
 Terry Lindholm as Once-ler (hands)
 Kay E. Kuter as the voice of Dr. Seuss

Uncredited
 Paul Winchell as some of the Sneetches (voice, archive footage)
 Boris Karloff as the Grinch (voice, archive footage) 
 June Foray as Cindy Lou Who (voice, archive footage)
 Bob Holt as the Once-ler, the Lorax, Sylvester McMonkey McBean, and some of the Sneetches (voice, archive footage)
 Charles Durning as Grandfather Yook (voice, archive footage and redubbed lines)
 Joseph Cousins as Grandson (voice, archive footage)

Stories featured
The film features many of Dr. Seuss's stories, though they are re-edits of older adaptations, while some of the adaptations are newly created live-action versions. It also includes some of his political work, including excerpts of his short subject Hitler Lives.

 The Sneetches (originally from DePatie-Freleng Enterprises's special, Dr. Seuss on the Loose and was re-edited; 1973)
 Hunches in Bunches (live-action)
 McElligot's Pool (live-action)
 Horton Hatches the Egg (originally a Merrie Melodies cartoon produced by Leon Schlesinger Productions in 1942 and directed by Bob Clampett; this cartoon is not only re-edited, but re-dubbed by Frank Welker)
 And to Think That I Saw It on Mulberry Street (originally a 1944 George Pal Puppetoon; not only re-edited, but re-told by J. D. Daniels)
 Hitler Lives (short documentary by Warner Bros. in 1945; not only re-edited, but re-dubbed by Frank Welker)
 Yertle the Turtle (live-action)
 The Cat in the Hat (live-action)
 Green Eggs and Ham (live-action)
 How the Grinch Stole Christmas! (originally the famous Chuck Jones television special created in 1966; this cartoon is not only re-edited, but the story is re-told by Eileen Brennan, while Boris Karloff and June Foray remain the voices of The Grinch and Cindy Lou Who)
 The Lorax (originally created by DePatie-Freleng Enterprises in 1972; the present-day scenes of the Once-ler are re-created in live-action)
 The Butter Battle Book (originally created by Ralph Bakshi in 1989; some of the verses that were omitted from the special, or were not said the correct way for the telling of the book, are added in this version and voiced by Charles Durning, who reprised his role as the grandfather, Frank Welker and Malachi Pearson)
 Oh, the Places You'll Go! (live-action)

Home media
Nearly two months before the television premiere on TNT, Turner Home Entertainment released In Search of Dr. Seuss directly to VHS on September 14, 1994, and also re-released it on June 6, 1995, the same date as the home video releases of Ralph Bakshi's The Butter Battle Book (1989) and Hanna-Barbera's Daisy-Head Mayzie (1995). At the same time, Turner combined these films on a single LaserDisc release with an exclusive distribution by Image Entertainment. On November 18, 2003, the film arrived on DVD for the first time, distributed by Warner Home Video. In March 2008, In Search of Dr. Seuss, Daisy-Head Mayzie, The Butter Battle Book, and the 1942 Merrie Melodies short Horton Hatches the Egg were included as bonus features on the Deluxe Edition DVD release of MGM Animation/Visual Arts' Horton Hears a Who! (1970).

References

External links 
 
 In Search of Dr. Seuss on Behind the Voices

American films with live action and animation
1994 films
1994 television films
Films about journalists
Films based on works by Dr. Seuss
TNT Network original films
Horton the Elephant
The Cat in the Hat